Olivier Fauconnier (born 22 June 1976) is a Guadeloupean former footballer who played as a centre forward. He has been a member of the Guadeloupe national team.

Club career
Fauconnier has played in the Metropolitan French Ligue 1 for Le Havre AC, OGC Nice and AC Ajaccio and in China for Henan Jianye.

International career
Fauconnier capped for Guadeloupe at senior level during the 2003 CONCACAF Gold Cup qualification (CFU Qualifying Tournament final round).

References

1976 births
Living people
People from Les Abymes
Guadeloupean footballers
Ligue 1 players
Le Havre AC players
OGC Nice players
AC Ajaccio players
Ligue 2 players
FC Gueugnon players
Angers SCO players
Championnat National players
Olympique Alès players
Championnat National 2 players
RC Lens players
Chinese Super League players
Henan Songshan Longmen F.C. players
Guadeloupe international footballers
Guadeloupean expatriate footballers
Guadeloupean expatriates in China
Expatriate footballers in China
Association football forwards